Yahia El-Mekachari (born February 7, 1990 in Gafsa) is a Tunisian light heavyweight amateur boxer who competed at the 2012 Olympics.

At the All-Africa Games 2011 he lost to eventual winner Abdelhafid Benchebla 7:14. but won the 2011 African Championships and the 2011 Pan-Arab Games.

He won the 2012 African Boxing Olympic Qualification Tournament to qualify for the 2012 Olympics.  At the Olympics he defeated veteran Jakhon Qurbonov 16:8 but lost to Elshod Rasulov 6:13 in the second round.

References 

Living people
Light-heavyweight boxers
Boxers at the 2012 Summer Olympics
Olympic boxers of Tunisia
Tunisian male boxers
1990 births
Competitors at the 2011 All-Africa Games
African Games competitors for Tunisia
21st-century Tunisian people